"Hit Sale" is a French language hit by the French band Therapie Taxi featuring additional vocals by Belgian rapper Roméo Elvis. The song is also the lead track of the same titled album Hit Sale released by Therapie Taxi. The single has topped Ultratop's Wallonia Singles Chart in addition to charting in France.

Charts

Weekly charts

Year-end charts

Certifications

See also
List of Ultratop 50 number-one singles of 2018

References

cc

French-language songs
Ultratop 50 Singles (Wallonia) number-one singles
2017 songs

fr:Therapie Taxi#Hit Sale (depuis 2017)